Samuel H. Gardner was the Allegheny County District Attorney for Pittsburgh until April 23, 1930.

See also

 District Attorney
 Pittsburgh Police
 Allegheny County Sheriff
 Allegheny County Police Department

Lawyers from Pittsburgh
County district attorneys in Pennsylvania